Urrbrae Agricultural High School is a public high school in the Australian state of South Australia, with approximately 1,016 students. It is adjacent to the Waite Agricultural Research Institute of the University of Adelaide, the CSIRO Agricultural Research facilities in the suburb of Urrbrae, and various other agricultural and horticultural facilities established by Peter Waite, the University of Adelaide, and the South Australian state government.

The school is designated as a Special Interest School in Agriculture and the Environment, and is the only comprehensive special interest agricultural secondary school in South Australia. Its courses are strongly focused on agriculture, horticulture, viticulture, aquaculture, environmental aspects of the earth, and other environmental subjects. In those aspects, it awards certificates. Urrbrae also has a strong science and technology background, with extensive technology workshops, and many related courses available to students; (e.g. environmental technology and automotive technology).  It also offers education programs for adults, and houses a TAFE campus.

Urrbrae Agricultural High School has an application process for students in Year 6 (before 2022 year 7) who wish to attend Urrbrae in their secondary school years. Unlike most public schools, Urrbrae is not part of the zonal system, and does not necessarily accept students based on where they live; being the only comprehensive special interest agricultural secondary school in the State, it has students from all over the state. Students from country and distant areas often board locally, and many students travel long distances to school.

The campus includes a 35 hectare farm, (total size including farm, wetland, school and TAFE is 45 hectares) and year 10 Urrbrae students give tours to visiting students from other schools. Urrbrae also has a swimming pool, a rock climbing wall, asphalt tennis courts and playing fields. A large corner of the site has been turned into a wetland, which is open to other schools to visit.

History 
The school was founded in 1932 through a bequest from Peter Waite, (a South Australian pastoralist and public benefactor), as a school to teach agriculture to boys. In 1972 it enrolled its first two female students, and in 2002 it achieved its first year-level that was equally represented by both genders.

The Urrbrae Old Scholars Association was established in 1934.

Buildings

Farm 
The UAHS farm is a 35 hectare farm which has many enterprises, including:

Sheep
Cattle
Poultry
Aquaculture (such as Barramundi and Yabbies)
Horses
Orchard
Bees
Alpacas
Marsupial Area (including native Australian animals, such as Wallabies, nocturnal species, lizards and snakes)
Goats
Vineyard (Wine is produced)
Olive trees
An extensive Wetland
Pigs
Native Animals

The Year 10, 11 and 12 students are involved in wine making, and with parental permission, are allowed to sample their own wine. Students are also able to make other produce, like butter and yoghurt, through Agriculture Studies courses. These include practical lessons during the week, where students are able to participate in hands-on activities in all the different enterprises at the school. Activities include grooming and caring for the animals, and making butter, olive oil, and dried fruit from the school orchard and vineyard. In Year 8, students undertake a "Home Project" where they care for an animal or a plant, and record their experiences. Students also make vegetable gardens (silver-beet, carrots, cabbages, beetroot, broccoli, olive trees, cauliflower etc.), and are permitted to take home or sell the produce they grow.

There are many lunch time clubs for students, with one for nearly every enterprise on the farm, including poultry, horses, plants and bee-keeping. Although club membership is voluntary, these clubs have high participation rates.

Uniform 

Females (but not limited to females);
Dress – Green Urrbrae dress
Skirt – Green Urrbrae skirt
Shorts – Grey shorts
Trousers – Grey trousers or bone moleskins
DARK denim straight jeans
Blouse – White with Urrbrae logo
Blazer/Jacket – Green Urrbrae jumper of various styles
Tights/Stockings/Pantyhose – Plain black or skin colour – no leggings
Socks – Black or white
Footwear – Black leather shoes with no stripes or logos and matching laces or black/brown work boots 
Scarf – Bottle green or Maroon

Males (but not limited to males);
Trousers – Grey trousers or bone moleskins
DARK denim straight jeans
Shorts – Grey shorts
Socks – White or black
Shirt – Green Urrbrae shirt with yellow logo
Blazer/Jacket – Green Urrbrae jumper of various styles
Footwear – Black shoes, no logos or stripes
Hat – Green Bucket Hat

Show Uniform
Shirt – Grey, available on loan
Trousers – Bone moleskin
School tie – available on loan

Physical Education
Shirt – Red with green stripes
Shorts – Black gym shorts
Shoes – White soled

Agriculture Uniform
Overalls
Hat
Boots
Dark blue denim jeans (enforced 2023)

Notable alumni

Federal politicians 
 Neil Andrew – former Federal speaker
 Graeme Campbell
 Patrick Secker

State politicians 
 Robert Brokenshire
 Bruce Eastick – Liberals leader in SA in Dunstan era, later Speaker in Tonkin Government years
 Peter Lewis – SA speaker

References

External links 
 Urrbrae Agricultural High School official website
 Urrbrae Old Scholars' Association web page
 UAHS Uniform Policy
 Vocational education information about the school

Public schools in South Australia
Australian schools providing vocational education
Special interest high schools in South Australia
Educational institutions established in 1913
1913 establishments in Australia
Agriculture in South Australia